The Greens–The Ecologist Alternative (EV–AE) is a political party based in Catalonia, founded in 1989 as The Greens–Green Union. In 1993 it joined The Greens–Ecologist Confederation of Catalonia, only to split from it in 1995. Until 2006 it would be mostly known as Ecologist Alternative of Catalonia.

References

Green political parties
Political parties in Catalonia
Political parties established in 1989
1989 establishments in Catalonia